This is a list of '''Wagner Seahawks football players in the NFL Draft.

Key

Selections

Source:

References

Lists of National Football League draftees by college football team

Wagner Seahawks NFL Draft